Northfield Township High School District 225, also called Glenbrook High Schools or Glenbrook High School District 225, is a high school district in Northfield Township, Cook County, Illinois, including most of the villages of Glenview and Northbrook, suburbs of Chicago. Golf and a small portion of western Northfield are also located within the high school district.

Schools
 Glenbrook North High School in Northbrook, formerly known as Glenbrook High School
 Glenbrook South High School in Glenview
 Glenbrook Evening High School, established in 1975
 Glenbrook Off-Campus, a special-needs school
 Glenbrook Academy of International Studies

See also
 Northbrook School District 27
 Northbrook School District 28
 Northbrook/Glenview School District 30
 West Northfield School District 31
 Glenview Community Consolidated School District 34

References

External links
 
  — previous website from 1996 to 2009

Northbrook, Illinois
Northfield, Illinois
School districts in Cook County, Illinois